A tree wrap or tree wrapping is a wrap of garden tree saplings, roses, and other delicate plants to protect them from frost damage (e.g. frost cracks or complete death). In the past it was made of straw (straw wrap) . Now there are commercial tree wrap  materials, such as crepe paper or burlap tapes. Tree wrapping  is also used to prevent saplings from sunscald and drying of the bark. A disadvantage of tape wrapping is dampness under the wrapping during rainy seasons.

References

Further reading
Frost and the Prevention of Frost Damage, by Floyd Dillon Young, 1929 (free at Google Books)
Describes, in part, various kinds of wraps and covers

Horticulture
Cryobiology